Silk Way West Airlines is an Azerbaijani cargo airline with its head office and main operating base at Heydar Aliyev International Airport in Baku, Azerbaijan. It is a subsidiary of the Silk Way Group along with sister airline, Silk Way Airlines which operates Il-76's.

History 
Founded in 2012 in Baku, Silk Way West Airlines is the largest cargo airline in the Caspian Sea region. The carrier is a part of Silk Way Group, which also includes Silk Way Airlines, and Silk Way Technics. Based at Heydar Aliyev International Airport, the airline operates around 350 monthly flights across the globe via its fleet of 12 dedicated Boeing 747-8F and 747-400F aircraft. The airline's annual cargo turnover exceeds 420,000 tons, while its growing route network covers over 40 destinations across Europe, the CIS, the Middle East, Central and Eastern Asia, and North and South America.

On April 28, 2021, Silk Way West Airlines signed a strategic fleet expansion agreement with Boeing for five Boeing 777 Freighters. Two more Boeing 747-400F were received in March 2022. On 28 June 2022, Silkway West also signed an agreement with Airbus for 2 Airbus A350 freighter aircraft, with an expected entry into service in 2027. The aircraft will be registered in Bermuda.

Destinations 
Silk Way West Airlines operates cargo flights to 45 destinations in Europe, Asia and North America. In October 2018, the company announced it would launch a twice-weekly freighter service from its hub in Baku to Tianjin in China.

Fleet 

As of December 2022, Silk Way West Airlines operates the following aircraft:

The additional fleet of Ilyushin Il-76 cargo aircraft is operated by sister company Silk Way Airlines.

References

External links 

 Official Website

Airlines of Azerbaijan
Airlines established in 2012
Cargo airlines